Maleng, also known as Pakatan and Bo, is a Vietic language of Laos and Vietnam.

Maleng has the four-way register system of Thavung augmented with pitch.Sidwell, Paul. Vietic languages. Mon-Khmer Languages Project.

Malieng, despite having the same name as Maleng, is a dialect of Chut (Chamberlain 2003, Sidwell 2009).

References

External links
https://web.archive.org/web/20120321112336/http://cema.gov.vn/modules.php?name=Content&op=details&mid=493

Languages of Laos
Languages of Vietnam
Vietic languages